Kadal Kadannu Oru Maathukutty is a 2013 Indian Malayalam comedy film written and directed by Ranjith and starring Mammootty in the lead role of an Achayan from Kozhencherry, Central Travancore and also in a cameo as himself. The cast includes Nedumudi Venu and Balachandra Menon, Siddique, Harisree Asokan, Suresh Krishna, P. Balachandran, Balachandran Chullikad, Prem Prakash, Meera Nandan, Muthumani, Krishna Prabha and Kaviyoor Ponnamma. The film was produced by Prithviraj Sukumaran, Santhosh Sivan, and Shaji Nadesan under the banner of August Cinema. The film was released on 8 August 2013 on the occasion of Eid-ul Fitr and was a critical and commercial failure. However modern reception has been positive.

Cast
 Mammootty as Kurudanjil George Mathew  (Mathukutty) and himself (dual role)
 Alisha Mohammed as Rosy
 Muthumani as Jansamma
 Meera Nandan as Kunjumol
 Sekhar Menon as Solaman
 Nedumudi Venu as Thomas
 Balachandra Menon as Fr. Kurian Vattathara
 Harisree Asokan as Rahman 
 P. Balachandran as Kochunni
 Tini Tom as Vidhyadharan
 Balachandran Chullikad  as Shamsu
 Narayanankutty as Ashokan
 Thesni Khan as a woman in Mathukkutty's village
 Adinadu Sasi as Sugunan
 Nandhu as Aanandhan and himself (dual role)
 Siddique as Abraham & himself (dual role)
 Suresh Krishna as Soman and  himself (dual role)
 Prem Prakash as Zachariya
 Kottayam Nazir as Kunjumon
 Kaviyoor Ponnamma as Mariyamma
 Krishna Praba as Deepa
 Chemban Vinod Jose 
 Soubin Shahir
 Daya Ashwathy

Cameos
 Mohanlal as himself
 Jayaram as himself
 Dileep as himself
 Jagadish as himself
 Idavela Babu as himself
 Manoj K. Jayan as himself
 Lakshmi Gopalaswamy as herself
 Manju Pillai as herself
 Bindu Panicker as herself
 Mythili as herself
 Johny Antony as himself

Production
The film was shot at Ayroor,Ranni, Kozhikode and  Kochi in India and Mettmann and Düsseldorf in Germany.   Asianet television is reported to have paid 5.75 crore for the rights to air the film, which would be a record.

Indiaglitz says "Kadal Kadannu Oru Maathukutty is average" and rated it 5.75/10 It received mixed reviews.

References

External links

2013 films
2013 comedy films
Indian comedy films
Films directed by Ranjith
Films shot in Kochi
Films shot in Kozhikode
2010s Malayalam-language films
Films scored by Shahabaz Aman
Films set in Germany
Films shot in Germany